WSMV-TV (channel 4) is a television station in Nashville, Tennessee, United States, affiliated with NBC. It is owned by Gray Television alongside low-power Telemundo affiliate WTNX-LD (channel 15). The two stations share studios on Knob Road in west Nashville, where WSMV-TV's transmitter is also located.

History

Early years
WSMV first signed on the air as WSM-TV on September 30, 1950, at 1:10 p.m. CT. It was Nashville's first television station and the second in Tennessee, behind fellow NBC affiliate WMCT (now sister station WMC-TV, then also on channel 4) in Memphis. As a result of the WSM-TV sign-on, WMCT was forced to switch to channel 5 to avoid co-channel interference. WSM-TV was owned by WSM, Inc., a subsidiary of the locally based National Life and Accident Insurance Company, which also owned WSM radio (650 AM) and the original WSM-FM (103.3; shut down in 1951); the AM station is renowned for broadcasts of the country music show The Grand Ole Opry, which has been heard on the station since 1925. The station took its call letters from its parent's slogan, "We Shield Millions."

The television station has been an NBC affiliate from its sign-on, although it also carried some programming from CBS, DuMont, and ABC. Its secondary affiliation with CBS ended in 1953, when WSIX-TV (channel 8, now WKRN-TV on channel 2) signed on as a primary CBS affiliate. WSM-TV shared ABC programming with WSIX-TV for a year until WLAC-TV (channel 5, now WTVF) signed on in 1954 as the market's new primary CBS affiliate, leaving WSIX-TV to take the ABC affiliation. In the late 1950s, the station also shared a short-lived affiliation with the NTA Film Network with WSIX-TV by airing one of its programs, Sheriff of Cochise. During the first few years of operation, AT&T would not run telephone lines for WSM-TV to receive network programming until there was another TV station in town. This problem was solved by the station running a private microwave relay transmission from fellow NBC affiliate and now sister station WAVE-TV in Louisville, Kentucky.

Growth into the 1960s and 1970s
WSM-TV's studios were originally located at 15th Avenue South and Compton Avenue in south Nashville, near the present Belmont University. In 1957, the station attempted to a build a larger tower in west Nashville, near Charlotte Avenue. During the construction process, the new tower's supporting wires failed. This caused the tower to collapse, which took the lives of several people. Afterward, WSM-TV purchased its present property on Knob Road (farther west than the previous site, and allowable since WMCT in Memphis had switched to channel 5 from channel 4) and built a tower there in a forested section away from potential damage to life and property.

WSM-TV shared its broadcast facilities with non-commercial station WDCN-TV (channel 2, now WNPT on channel 8) beginning in 1962. In 1963, National Life and Accident Insurance built new studios for WSM-AM-TV adjacent to the transmission tower on Knob Road. This left WDCN-TV as the sole occupant of the south Nashville building, where that station remained until 1976. WSM-TV was the first station in Nashville to begin broadcasting in color in 1965. In 1974, NL&AI reorganized itself as a holding company, NLT Corporation, with the WSM stations (by then including a new WSM-FM at 95.5) as a major subsidiary.

Ownership changes
Beginning in 1980, Houston-based insurer American General–which owned the WLAC stations until 1975–began purchasing blocks of NLT stock, eventually becoming NLT's largest shareholder and setting the stage for an outright takeover. However, American General was not interested in NLT's non-insurance businesses. It opted to sell off the broadcasting interests, the Grand Ole Opry, the then-decrepit Ryman Auditorium, and Opryland USA. Gillett Broadcasting (operated by George N. Gillett Jr.) bought WSM-TV on November 3, 1981, and changed the station's callsign to WSMV on the same day (officially modified to WSMV-TV on July 15, 1982). The new callsign allowed channel 4 to continue trading on the well-known WSM calls while at the same time separating it from its former radio sisters. The change was brought on due to an FCC rule in place at that time forbidding TV and radio stations in the same city but with different owners from sharing the same call letters. However, channel 4 would later engage in news department cross promotions with WSM-AM-FM.

Gaylord Entertainment Company purchased the remainder of WSM, Inc. nearly two years later, in 1983. Soon afterward, the radio stations moved out of the Knob Road facility into new studios on the Opryland Hotel campus.

WSMV-TV was sold on June 8, 1989, to Cook Inlet Television Partners, an Alaska-based company which was a subsidiary of Cook Inlet Region, Inc., an Alaska Native Regional Corporation.

Meredith Corporation ownership

Cook Inlet sold WSMV on January 5, 1995, to the Meredith Corporation. WSMV was not part of the affiliation deal between several Meredith stations and CBS (however, Meredith's only other NBC affiliate at the time, WNEM-TV in Bay City, Michigan, was) because the purchase was announced seven months after the affiliation deal had been finalized. As a result, WSMV became the only NBC affiliate in Meredith's portfolio until their 2021 sale.

In early March 2009, it was announced that WSMV's master control operations would be hubbed at Meredith-owned sister station WGCL-TV in Atlanta. The new hub operation launched in summer 2009.

On September 8, 2015, Media General announced that it would acquire Meredith for $2.4 billion, with the combined group to be renamed Meredith Media General. Because Media General owned WKRN-TV, and the two stations rank among the four highest-rated stations in the Nashville market in total day viewership, the companies would have been required to sell either WSMV-TV or WKRN to comply with FCC ownership rules as well as recent changes to those rules regarding same-market television stations that restrict sharing agreements. On January 27, 2016, Nexstar Broadcasting Group announced that it had reached an agreement to acquire Media General. This resulted in the termination of the acquisition of Meredith by Media General.

Sale to Gray Television
On May 3, 2021, Gray Television announced its intent to purchase the Meredith Local Media division for $2.7 billion. The sale was completed on December 1. As a result, WSMV became a sister station to several other stations in nearby markets, including fellow NBC affiliates WMC-TV in Memphis and WAFF in Huntsville, CBS affiliate WVLT-TV in Knoxville and ABC/Fox affiliate WBKO in Bowling Green. It also resulted in Gray owning a station in Circle's home market, which in turn became the network's flagship station. Gray also immediately changed the station's positioning from "News 4" to "WSMV 4" and implemented a new graphics scheme, resulting in the 4 logo switching from primarily black to primarily white. In 2022, the station launched a heavily localized imaging campaign, reviving the "Nashville's Station" nickname, and inviting viewers to "Come On Back" after years of ratings losses.

Subchannel history

WSMV-DT2
WSMV-DT2 is the Ion Mystery-affiliated second digital subchannel of WSMV-TV, broadcasting in 16:9 widescreen standard definition on channel 4.2.

As Telemundo Nashville
The subchannel launched in the summer of 2006 as an affiliate of NBC-owned Spanish-language television network Telemundo since the Nashville market lacked a standalone Telemundo affiliate of its own. The second subchannel was branded as Telemundo Nashville. The subchannel went defunct on December 31, 2010, leaving Nashville with only one Spanish-language television station, WLLC-LP (Channel 42), the area's Telefutura (now UniMás) outlet. (WLLC-LP has since added Univision as their primary affiliation on 42.1, with UniMás moving to 42.2.) The subchannel's spectrum would be used for purposes other than over-the-air broadcasting once the subchannel went dark.

As The Nashville Network/Heartland
WSMV-DT2 relaunched on November 1, 2012, when it became the flagship station of the new re-incarnation of The Nashville Network. This move reflected the history of WSM radio, the former radio sister of WSMV, as it was one of the original founders of the original pay-TV-exclusive TNN when it launched in 1983. The network was renamed Heartland in October 2013. WSMV-DT2 continued to serve as the flagship station of Heartland, with some of the operations of the network still based in Nashville, while the rest of the operations were based in Chattanooga, Tennessee (where Heartland's owner, Luken Communications, has their headquarters).

As Escape/Court TV Mystery/Ion Mystery
On November 1, 2016, WSMV's contract with Luken Communications to carry Heartland expired, and Heartland was replaced by Escape, a television channel aimed towards a female audience; the channel also shows crime drama programs & movies aimed towards women. WSMV-DT2 has cleared all of Escape's programming since the switch occurred. Escape can also be seen on Charter Communications cable channel 180, and Comcast Xfinity cable channel 230. The name changed to Court TV Mystery on September 29, 2019. The network name changed again this time to Ion Mystery on February 24, 2022.

WSMV-DT3
WSMV-DT3 is the Cozi TV-affiliated third digital subchannel of WSMV-TV, broadcasting in 16:9 widescreen standard definition on channel 4.3.

On March 23, 2015, the Web site TVNewsCheck.com reported that eight stations owned by Meredith Corp. had reached an agreement to add the NBCUniversal-owned Cozi TV to their multicast channels. Included in the list of stations was WSMV. The Web site Rabbitears.info indicates that WSMV is broadcasting Cozi TV on the DT3 subchannel, which began broadcasting on May 28, 2015.

WSMV-DT4
WSMV-DT4 is the Oxygen-affiliated fourth digital subchannel of WSMV-TV, broadcasting in 16:9 widescreen standard definition on channel 4.4.

On May 9, 2019, WSMV signed on a fourth subchannel to carry the recently relaunched Court TV. On December 29, 2022, Court TV was replaced with Oxygen.

WSMV-DT5
WSMV-DT5 is the Circle-affiliated fifth digital subchannel of WSMV-TV, broadcasting in 16:9 widescreen standard definition on channel 4.5.

In January 2020, WSMV signed on a fifth subchannel to carry the country music and lifestyle multicast network Circle, a joint venture of Gray Television and Opry Entertainment Group, becoming the network's flagship station with its purchase by Gray. As Circle also broadcasts the Grand Ole Opry live every Saturday, WSMV is a joint broadcaster of the program with former sister radio station WSM.

WSMV-DT6
WSMV-DT6 is the getTV-affiliated fifth digital subchannel of WSMV-TV, broadcasting in 16:9 widescreen standard definition on channel 4.6.

The sixth subchannel for WSMV was launched in September 2022.

Programming

Country music programming
The WSM stations' close ties to Nashville's country music business has meant that the Knob Road facility and/or its personnel was, from time to time, used for the recording of network and syndicated programs featuring Nashville-based performers. This was especially the case during the 1960s and 1970s. Most if not all of these shows were packaged by Show Biz, Inc., headquartered in Nashville and a subsidiary of Holiday Inn. Show Biz, Inc. produced The Porter Wagoner Show, That Nashville Music, The Bill Anderson Show, Dolly! and several other programs seen throughout the United States, especially on stations in the South and rural Midwest. The company dissolved in the late 1970s when its president, Jane Grams, became vice president and general manager of WTVC-TV in Chattanooga, Tennessee. However, the Show Biz programs were seen on some stations well into the early 1980s.

Sports programming
Since 2006, channel 4 airs any Sunday Night Football games that involve the market's NFL team, the Tennessee Titans. The station also aired Nashville Predators games via NBC's broadcast contract with the NHL that lasted until 2021; this includes the team's appearance in the 2017 Stanley Cup Final.

From 1987 until March 2002, WSMV-TV was the primary Nashville home to syndicated Southeastern Conference football and men's basketball games originating from Jefferson Pilot Sports, but sharing some broadcasts with WZTV (channel 17) from 1987 to 1990, and WXMT (channel 30, now MyNetworkTV affiliate WUXP) from 1990 onward. All of those games moved to WUXP in 2002, and stayed with that station until 2009, when Raycom Sports lost the syndication rights to ESPN Regional Television. WUXP carried ESPN Plus-oriented SEC TV until 2014, when the SEC Network was launched.

Past programming preemptions and deferrals
In the mid-1980s, WSMV dropped the Tonight Show to air sitcom reruns such as Three's Company, Alice, Barney Miller, Family Ties, and Rosie. NBC was able to get the show on in Nashville on then-independent station (now Fox affiliate) WZTV.

In early 2006, WSMV attracted some attention by becoming the largest NBC affiliate in terms of market size to refuse to carry the controversial NBC show The Book of Daniel on its schedule, after the premiere episode. This action, along with that of several smaller affiliates in the Midwest and South, as well as low ratings, prompted NBC to cancel the series after only three episodes.

On October 26, 2014, WSMV accidentally preempted parts of the first half of the Manchester United–Chelsea Premier League match and instead aired Poppy Cat from the NBC Kids block. This triggered negative responses from social media.

News operation

WSMV-TV broadcasts 53 hours of locally produced newscasts each week (with nine hours each weekday and four hours each on Saturdays and Sundays); in regards to the number of hours devoted to news programming, it is the highest local newscast output among all broadcast television stations in the Nashville market.

WSM-TV's news department was the first in the United States to receive satellite photographs when it first used them in 1964. Beginning in the mid-1970s, WSM-TV developed a strong news division that, in the 1980s through the 1990s, won numerous regional and national awards (Peabody Awards among them) for in-depth and investigative reporting. Mike Kettenring was the news director for much of that period along with Alan Griggs and Al Tompkins. For most of the last two decades, WSMV has been a solid runner-up to WTVF in the Nashville ratings. Generally speaking, the station takes a softer approach to news than WTVF. The reverse was true in the 1980s, as WSMV earned awards for hard-hitting investigative stories, while WTVF took a more cautious approach. While WTVF usually leads the way in the city of Nashville itself, WSMV generally leads in Nashville's more conservative suburbs, as well as outlying rural parts of the market, many of whose residents recall readily the station's past association with WSM-AM. In recent years, however, ABC affiliate WKRN has steadily increased their ratings, particularly in the evening and late newscasts. In the November 2017 sweeps, WKRN passed WSMV as runner-up in the 5 p.m. and 6 p.m. newscasts, and tied WSMV for second place in the 10 p.m. newscast.

On March 5, 1973, the Vanderbilt Television News Archive recorded off the air of WSM-TV a special broadcast of Today aimed toward veterans of the Vietnam War returning home to the U.S. Two months later, on May 1, another broadcast of Today was recorded concerning the Watergate scandal. On both of these broadcasts, Pat Sajak, who had recently joined the WSM radio and TV staff, anchored the five-minute cut-in local newscasts. As it was not the general policy of the Archive to record special programs such as these or local Nashville programming, these probably represent the only known broadcasts of WSM-TV news before 1980 or so available for public viewing, prior to the widespread popularity of consumer-level video cassette recorders in the late 1970s. The only other ones were local cut-ins to NBC coverage of national elections. Because of the equipment at the time, though, the broadcasts were recorded in black and white. The Archive, prior to the advent of satellite technology in the 1980s, taped all NBC News broadcasts from the airwaves of WSM(V).

In September 1973, WSM-TV decided to fill the 6:30–7 p.m. time slot opened up by the Prime Time Access Rule in 1971 by expanding its 6 p.m. newscast to one hour. This has proven so successful that to this day WSMV programs a newscast from 6 to 7 p.m. (although it is now broken up into two 30-minute segments). Upon the success of the expanded 6 p.m. newscast on channel 4 (and after years of low-rated syndicated offerings in the 6:30 slot), WTVF followed suit in 1989 by expanding its 6 p.m. newscast to one hour. WSMV and WTVF are among the few stations in the Central Time Zone to run newscasts at 6:30 (stations elsewhere have attempted it since the 1970s with varying degrees of success). WKRN is the only traditional network affiliate in the Nashville market to run only a half-hour of news at 6 p.m., with Wheel of Fortune (hosted by former WSM personality Pat Sajak) airing at 6:30.

In the early 1980s, WSMV introduced the Snowbird character, a scarf- and earmuff-wearing anthropomorphic penguin, as a brand for its weather-related school closing reports. Snowbird appears on-air in both animated and puppet form. Snowbird reports are shown on the station primarily in the winter, but the branding is also used for unexpected school closings caused by other natural and man-made events, not necessarily limited to snow and ice. Due to the character's popularity, Snowbird serves as a year-round mascot for the station, with a -tall costumed version making appearances at community events and station promotions. The station has also engaged in giving away Snowbird-themed apparel and tchotchkes as prizes during sweeps promotions. The Snowbird character has since been licensed to television stations in other markets, including WMC-TV in Memphis, WRCB in Chattanooga, WBOY-TV in Clarksburg, West Virginia, and WTOV-TV in Steubenville, Ohio, all NBC affiliates.

During the May sweeps period that began on April 26, 2007, WSMV debuted its own news helicopter known as Air 4, becoming the second station in Nashville to do so (WTVF's news helicopter Sky 5 debuted a year earlier, in 2006). On September 15, 2008, beginning with the 5:00 p.m. newscast, WSMV became the second television station in Nashville (after WTVF) to begin broadcasting its local newscasts in high definition.

On May 26, 2011, WSMV debuted an hour-long 4 p.m. newscast, serving as a replacement for The Oprah Winfrey Show, which ended its 25-year run the day before; this came on the heels of the expansion of other non-news local programming such as More at Midday and Better Nashville, indicating a decreased reliance on syndicated programming. On January 25, 2014, WSMV was the first station to expand its weekend morning newscast to 5:00 a.m. in the Nashville TV market.

On July 17, 2017, WSMV changed their newscast branding from Channel 4 News to News 4. In January 2018, the station's news graphics and music were updated.

On August 18, 2022, it was reported that WSMV would drop all syndicated programming and air expanded newscasts and locally produced programming outside of network hours. On September 5, 2022, WSMV became the first station in Nashville to offer local news at 3 p.m., while also expanding its midday newscast to two hours, and moving Today in Nashville to 2 p.m., replacing the canceled Wendy Williams Show.

Past on-air staff
The station's former staff include Pat Sajak (announcer and weekend weatherman from 1974 to 1977), Robin Roberts (sports anchor and reporter from 1986 to 1988), John Tesh(news anchor from 1975 to 1976), John Seigenthaler Jr. (weekend anchor in the late 1980s) and Huell Howser (features reporter in the 1970s).

Ralph Emery, the longtime country music disc jockey on WSM radio for many years, hosted morning (and at times, afternoon) shows on channel 4 from the mid-1960s until 1993; for much of that time, The Ralph Emery Show was the highest-rated locally produced early morning shows on American television. Although the show included regular news briefs, its main focus was on general entertainment, including a heavy emphasis on live country music performed in studio. It featured acts by prominent country stars like Tex Ritter and current star Lorrie Morgan; also, the studio band consisted of top-notch Music Row session musicians. Emery would achieve widespread fame by hosting a national version of the show, entitled Nashville Now, weeknights on The Nashville Network from 1983 to 1993. Upon Emery's retirement, WSMV briefly produced a local version of NBC's Today to serve as a lead-in to the national show. As Nashville Today failed to live up to expectations, WSMV finally programmed full-scale newscasts in early mornings, becoming the last of the three major Nashville stations to do so.

Larry Munson, WSM-TV's sports director from 1956 to 1967 and later known as the play-by-play announcer for radio broadcasts of Georgia Bulldogs football (and, for a time, the NFL's Atlanta Falcons), created and hosted a long-running hunting and fishing show called The Rod & Gun Club. Paul Eells replaced Munson as sports director in 1967. Like his predecessor, Eells served as the voice of the Vanderbilt Commodores football team during his time at WSM. Eells left to become the sports director at KATV in Little Rock, Arkansas in 1978. There, he also served as radio play-by-play announcer for the Arkansas Razorbacks for 28 years until his death in 2006. Munson died in 2011.

Dan Miller was co-anchor of the main evening newscasts for nearly 40 years, except from August 1986 to March 1995. During this period, Miller spent time in Los Angeles as a news anchor at KCBS-TV, and as sidekick to friend and former WSM-TV colleague Pat Sajak on his short-lived CBS late-night talk show The Pat Sajak Show. Miller returned to WSMV in 1992 to host 5 O'Clock with Dan Miller, which ran from 1992 to 1993. Miller returned to anchoring duties for the evening newscasts in March 1995, and continued until his sudden death in 2009.

In 1974, Bill Hall joined the staff as a weather reporter and morning news anchor. He briefly worked as a weekend news anchor in 1976 before moving into his role leading the weather team in 1977. His unique style and personality made him one of Middle Tennessee's most well known local television personalities. He punctuated his weather discussions with comments about gardening, cooking, and hunting and fishing. During his channel 4 career, Hall also hosted Land and Lakes, an outdoors show focusing on local hunting and fishing adventures. Hall retired in 2005, and later died on December 23, 2011.

Rudy Kalis began anchoring the morning newscasts in 2014 after working in the sports department for 40 years. He was the second sportscaster in Nashville to move to anchoring the morning news in the past year. He retired in November 2017, after 43 years with channel 4.

Longtime anchor Demetria Kalodimos was let go after her contract expired at the end of 2017.

Notable former on-air staff
 Charlie Chase – (1970s; now host for the Crook and Chase television show and countdown)
 Huell Howser – (1970s; died January 7, 2013)
 Demetria Kalodimos – anchor (worked with station from 1984 to 2017)
 Sondra Locke – (1960s; died November 3, 2018)
 Carol Marin – investigative reporter/anchor (1976–1978; later with WMAQ-TV in Chicago as the station's political editor)
 Dan Miller – anchor (died April 8, 2009)
 Robin Roberts – sports anchor/reporter (1986–1988; now anchor of Good Morning America)
 Pat Sajak – weather reporter (1970s; now host of the syndicated game show Wheel of Fortune)
 John Tesh – (musician; former anchor of Entertainment Tonight)

Technical information

Subchannels
The station's digital signal is multiplexed:

Analog-to-digital conversion
WSMV-TV shut down its analog signal, over VHF channel 4, on June 12, 2009, the official date in which full-power television stations in the United States transitioned from analog to digital broadcasts under federal mandate. The station's digital signal remained on its pre-transition VHF channel 10. Through the use of PSIP, digital television receivers display the station's virtual channel as its former VHF analog channel 4.

Translators

Out-of-market coverage

South-central Kentucky 
For its first 50 years on the air, WSMV was the default NBC affiliate for the Bowling Green media market in south-central Kentucky, since it did not have an NBC affiliate of its own when Arbitron first assigned Bowling Green in its own media market in 1977 following the success and growth of that area's ABC affiliate (and now sister station) WBKO, which, until 1989, was the only commercial television station in the Bowling Green area at the time. WSMV had a historical monopoly in providing NBC programming for that area from its September 1950 inception until March 27, 2001, when WKNT (channel 40, now WNKY) was forced to drop its Fox network affiliation due to that station's violation of the terms in their affiliation agreement. Immediately after losing Fox, that station became an NBC affiliate as it was re-called as WNKY, causing many Bowling Green area cable systems to drop WSMV. However, even after WNKY switched to NBC in 2001, WSMV remains on Mediacom cable systems serving the Morgantown (Butler County) and Brownsville (Edmonson County) areas. The Glasgow Electric Plant Board also still carried WSMV and its associated subchannels on their lineup until late 2017 when WNKY claimed market exclusivity on that system in terms of NBC and CBS affiliates.

Mediacom also carries WSMV on its systems in Hart and Metcalfe Counties (including Munfordville and Edmonton, respectively).

Western Kentucky 
In addition to the station's cable coverage in south central Kentucky, WSMV-TV, and the other two "Big Three" stations are also carried in Murray, Kentucky, in the Paducah, KY–Cape Girardeau, MO–Harrisburg, IL media market, via Murray Electric Systems. WK&T Cable also carries both WSMV and WTVF on its cable lineup for its customers in Calloway County. WSMV, along with WTVF, are also available to Mediacom's customers in Caldwell and Crittenden Counties, respectively including the communities of Princeton and Marion, along with the town of Fredonia. All of those areas are also within the Paducah/Cape Girardeau market, which is the home market to fellow NBC affiliate WPSD-TV.

WSMV was also previously available in some southern areas of the Evansville, Indiana media market, mainly including northwestern Kentucky towns such as Madisonville, Central City, Beaver Dam, and Owensboro and their corresponding counties. The Owensboro Messenger-Inquirer still lists WSMV on its TV listings page. Cable systems in those areas have since dropped the station making Evansville NBC affiliate and sister station WFIE the sole NBC affiliate on cable and over-the-air in those areas.

West Tennessee
WSMV, along with WMC-TV in Memphis, was historically carried on cable systems in the Jackson, Tennessee market on the Jackson Energy Authority's EPlus Broadband system. In November 2014, WSMV was dropped from that cable system when WNBJ-LD signed on as that area's own NBC affiliate. WNBJ replaced WSMV on JEA channel 4, with WMC-TV being left intact. In spite of the existence of WNBJ-LD in Jackson, WSMV remains on WK&T Telecom's cable system in Gibson County, in the northernmost area of the Jackson market. WSMV is also still available on cable in Carroll County as well.

Huntsville/Northern Alabama 
At sometime from 1957 until the 1980s, CATV and cable systems in northern Alabama, including Knology (now Wide Open West) and TelePrompTer (later Group W Cable, now Comcast Xfinity), carried all of Nashville's Big Three stations, only to be dropped from those systems in the 1980s amid the gradual increase of the launches of new national cable channels. The Nashville stations were once seen as far south as Decatur.

References

External links

Huntsville Rewound-Huntsville AL TV Memories

SMV-TV
NBC network affiliates
Ion Mystery affiliates
Cozi TV affiliates
Court TV affiliates
Circle (TV network) affiliates
GetTV affiliates
Peabody Award winners
Television channels and stations established in 1950
Gray Television
1950 establishments in Tennessee
Former Meredith Corporation subsidiaries